CIGA may refer to:

Cavity Insulation Guarantee Agency UK provider of guarantee and operator of certification scheme for cavity wall insulation
Compagnia Italiana Grandi Alberghi, a defunct hotel company purchased by ITT Sheraton in 1994
Council of Irish Guiding Associations, national Guiding federation of the Republic of Ireland